Marius Aam (born 14 November 1980) is a retired Norwegian football defender who notably played in Tippeligaen for Aalesund.

He started his career in Aalesund, and played first-tier football for them in Tippeligaen 2003 and 2005. He was not a first-team regular, and quit the team in early 2006. The next season, he fielded for Ålesund's second best club at the time, Skarbøvik IF.

Leaving Skarbøvik ahead of the 2009 season, he later featured for sixth-tier club Hessa. He also made a comeback in Skarbøvik.

References

1980 births
Living people
Sportspeople from Ålesund
Norwegian footballers
Aalesunds FK players
Eliteserien players
Norwegian First Division players
Association football defenders